Diego José de Cádiz (1743–1801) was a Spanish Capuchin friar who was a noted and popular preacher throughout the region of Andalusia during the 18th century. He was beatified by the Catholic Church in 1894.

Life

Early life
José Francisco López-Caamaño y García Pérez was born in Cádiz in 1743. His lineage dated from the Visigoth kings. His mother died when he was 9 years old. Later his father moved the family to the city of Grazalema, where he entered the local school run by the Dominican Order. As a youth Joseph could make no progress at school, receiving the nickname of the "dunce of Cadiz". Later a classmate, a Dominican friar named Antonio Querero, testified how difficult study had been for him.

Initially rejected by the Observant Franciscan friars due to this perceived limitation of intellect, López-Caamaño was later accepted by the Capuchin friars and, at the age of 15, entered their novitiate in Seville, at which time he was given the name Didacus Joseph. He was professed as a member of the Order on 31 March 1759. He was ordained to the priesthood in Carmona in 1766, for which he prepared himself by an extremely ascetic life.

Capuchin preacher
In 1771, after further training in homiletics, he was assigned to one of the teams of friars who would preach parish missions to residents of isolated, rural villages, which was a major focus of the Capuchins of that era. His biographers stated that the congregations marveled at the tender love he displayed to the crucifix he would hold while preaching, and the singular power of his words, which swayed his audiences and left an impression on their lives. He wandered throughout the entire peninsula on foot, preaching in this way to the various communities he encountered on the road.

Spain was undergoing changes in its intellectual climate, as the influence of the Enlightenment began to spread in the upper classes of the country. Didacus became a major force in promoting the traditional devotions and beliefs of Catholicism as part of the identity of the nation, and is seen as an early integrist in the development of Spanish culture, opposing Liberal Catholicism. He also was a strong critic of the policy of consumerism, being promoted in the universities and some government circles. For this teaching, he was denounced to the Spanish Inquisition for attacking royal prerogatives. In turn, he accused the proponents of new economic policies and the secularization of Spanish society of heresy.  He preached at the Royal Court in 1783, but found that he had no effect on the nobility. Leaving Madrid in disappointment, he later wrote: "I do not want the royal couple to remember me".

Didacus was appointed an official of the Inquisition, the synodal examiner for almost all Spanish dioceses and an honorary canon. The University of Granada conferred upon him the honorary degrees of Master of Arts and doctorates in Theology and canon law. A collection of his sermons numbers 3,000.

Death and veneration
Didacus died in 1801, apparently as a result of yellow fever, at the age of 58, in Ronda, Málaga. His remains are kept for veneration in an urn in the small, simple chapel of Our Lady of Peace in Ronda where he died, on the square now named in the friar's honor.

He was beatified by Pope Leo XIII in 1894.

Hagiography
 
This unlearned man became a celebrated preacher in Spain. During his sermon one day, a child shouted aloud in the church: "Mother, mother, see the dove resting on the shoulder of Father Didacus! I could preach like that too if a dove told me all that I should say!" Didacus prayed devotedly before his sermons, even scourging himself to the point of blood, in order to draw down God's mercy upon the people.

Once when his superior chided him because of the austerity of his life, Didacus Joseph replied: "Ah, Father, my sins and the sins of the people compel me to do it. Those who have been charged with the conversion of sinners must remember that the Lord has imposed upon them the sins of all their clients. By means of our penances we should atone for the sins of our fellowmen and thus preserve ourselves and them from eternal death. It would hardly be too much if we shed the last drop of our blood for their conversion."

Three miraculous events are recorded of his life, all having taken place in the main square of Cadiz. In one, he was able to save the life of a builder who had fallen off a roof, stopping his fall with one hand. On another occasion, a priest passed him while en route to administer the Last Sacraments to a dying person. When the acolyte accompanying the priest pointed out to the friar that he had not removed his hood (the customary form of reverence to the Blessed Sacrament which the priest would be carrying), Didacus told him, "Tell the priest that the ciborium is empty". This turned out to be the case. On yet another occasion, a heavy rainstorm hit the city. The square, where Didacus happened to be preaching at the time, was the only spot on which no rain fell.

See also
 Diego José de Cádiz, patron saint archive

References

1743 births
1801 deaths
People from Cádiz
Capuchins
18th-century Spanish Roman Catholic priests
19th-century Spanish Roman Catholic priests
Deaths from yellow fever
Burials in the Province of Málaga
Spanish beatified people
Franciscan beatified people
18th-century venerated Christians
19th-century venerated Christians
Beatifications by Pope Leo XIII